P. glaucus  may refer to:
 Papilio glaucus, the Eastern tiger swallowtail, a butterfly species native to North America
 Phyllobius glaucus, a weevil species found across Europe
 Phyllocladus glaucus, now Phyllocladus aspleniifolius, the celery-top pine
 Pluteus glaucus, a medicinal mushroom
 Pseudomys glaucus, the blue-gray mouse

See also
 Glaucus (disambiguation)